The rusty thicketbird (Cincloramphus rubiginosus) is a bird species. Previously placed in the "Old World warbler" family Sylviidae, it does not seem to be a close relative of the typical warblers; probably it belongs in the grass warbler family Locustellidae. It is found in New Britain only.

References

rusty thicketbird
Birds of New Britain
rusty thicketbird
rusty thicketbird
Taxonomy articles created by Polbot
Taxobox binomials not recognized by IUCN